Liberty Township is one of ten townships in Adair County, Missouri, United States. As of the 2010 census, its population was 324. Liberty Township was probably named from the patriotic concept of liberty.

Geography
Its eastern boundary is formed by the Chariton River, and its western edge is that of the county. The township contains no incorporated settlements, though there are named places such as Midland (once known as Tipperary") and Youngstown, both of which served the coal mines once worked in the area. It contains seven cemeteries: Baden Springs, Lutz, Mount Moriah, Parcell Salisbury, Pinkerton, Pratt and Ringo Point.

References

 USGS Geographic Names Information System (GNIS)

External links
 US-Counties.com
 City-Data.com

Townships in Adair County, Missouri
Kirksville micropolitan area, Missouri
Townships in Missouri